Monoplex macrodon is a species of predatory sea snail, a marine gastropod mollusk in the family Cymatiidae.

Distribution
This species is present in Baja California, Mexico – Colombia, in Galápagos, Clipperton Island and Cocos Island.

Description

Bibliography
The Recent Molluscan Marine Fauna of the Islas Galápagos, p 32
Ranellidae & Personidae of the World, Pl. 14/3
Bull. Am. Mus. Nat. Hist., Vol. 262, p 122
Valenciennes A. (1832). Coquilles univalves marines de l'Amérique équinoxiale, recueillies pendant le voyage de MM. A. de Humboldt et A. Bonpland. pp. 262–339, pl. 57. In: A. von Humboldt & A. Bonpland (eds), Observations de zoologie et d'anatomie comparée
Beu A.G. 2010 [August]. Neogene tonnoidean gastropods of tropical and South America: contributions to the Dominican Republic and Panama Paleontology Projects and uplift of the Central American Isthmus. Bulletins of American Paleontology 377-378: 550 pp, 79 pls.

References

External links
 Jax Shells

Cymatiidae
Gastropods described in 1832